Logbasis (in Greek Λογβασις; killed in 218 BC), a citizen of Selge in Pisidia (today part of Turkey). When Selge was attacked by Garsyeris, the general of Achaeus, in 218 BC, Logbasis, as having been guardian to Achaeus' wife Laodice, was deputed by his countrymen to treat with the enemy, and used the opportunity to make a treacherous agreement for the surrender of the city. His design, however, was detected on the very eve of its completion, and his fellow-citizens burst into his house, and slew him, together with his sons and the enemy's soldiers who were secreted there.

References
Polybius,  Histories, Evelyn S. Shuckburgh (translator), London - New York, (1889)
Smith, William; Dictionary of Greek and Roman Biography and Mythology, "Logbasis", Boston, (1867)

Notes 

218 BC deaths
Hellenistic-era people
Year of birth unknown